Holder is a term used to any person that has in their custody a promissory note, bill of  exchange
or cheque. It should be entitled in his own name.
Holder means a person entitled in his own name to the possession of a negotiable instrument and to receive the amount due on it.
Business law